The Iron Mule is a 1925 American silent comedy film directed by Roscoe Arbuckle and Grover Jones.

Plot
It is 1830 in Likskillet. The Iron Mule is a steam engine used to haul converted carriages on a rail. A cow on the tracks delays their start. The driver has to take the tall funnel off for the engine to go through the low tunnel.

They reach a river.. there is no bridge...They attach logs and float over. The journey then becomes river-based for a while. They then drive on the rails all night.

The next morning  cowboy ties a horse to the last carriage. The train cannot pull it. The male passengers gamble on a spinning wheel until stopped by one of the women. The train moves off without the driver or any male passenger. They chase after it.

They reach Sassafras. A group of indians put logs on the tracks and derail the engine. They start firing arrows which lodge in an open carriage door. The men arrive and the driver fights off the indians but one male passenger is chased by an indian with a tomahawk. As he runs he passes his toupee to the indian (as though it were a scalp). It reads "Genuine Unborn Plush Wig: Sears Roebuck Co.".

The engine moves off but he carriages uncouple. The passengers run after it.

Cast
 Al St. John as the engine driver
 George Davis a passenger
 Glen Cavender
 Doris Deane a passenger
 Buster Keaton as Indian (uncredited)

See also
 Fatty Arbuckle filmography

References

External links

1925 films
Films directed by Roscoe Arbuckle
Films directed by Grover Jones
1925 comedy films
1925 short films
American silent short films
American black-and-white films
Silent American comedy films
American comedy short films
1920s American films